Colbert County is a county located in the northwestern part of the U.S. state of Alabama. As of the 2020 census the county's population was 57,227. The county seat is Tuscumbia. The largest city is Muscle Shoals. 

The county is named in honor of brothers George and Levi Colbert, who were Chickasaw chiefs in the early 19th century in this territory. Ultimately the federal government forced the removal of most of the Chickasaw and other historic tribes from the Southeast. 

Colbert County is part of the Florence–Muscle Shoals, AL Metropolitan Statistical Area, also known as "The Shoals".

History
The Chickasaw and Cherokee peoples are the earliest known inhabitants of Colbert County, an area that was part of their territories for hundreds of years. Before they emerged, there were earlier cultures of indigenous peoples who established settlements and seasonal villages for thousands of years in the area. 

In the 1810s, settlers began to settle in an area at a crossroads that developed as Leighton, Alabama. Colbert County was originally established during the Reconstruction era after the American Civil War on February 6, 1867. The state legislature split it from Franklin County over political issues. It was abolished eight months later on November 29, 1867 by an Alabama constitutional convention, and reestablished by the legislature on February 24, 1870.  

In 1890, the eastern boundary of Colbert County was changed from County Line Road to Town Creek; this resulted in all of the town of Leighton placed within Colbert County. Colbert County is the location of Ivy Green, the birthplace of noted author and activist Helen Keller.  Colbert County includes the cities of Sheffield and Muscle Shoals, where many popular American and British musicians, such as Aretha Franklin and the Rolling Stones, respectively, recorded music. 

Also located in Colbert County is the Key Underwood Coon Dog Memorial Graveyard established in 1937. Coon dogs were bred and trained for hunting in this region.

Geography
The county's elevation ranges from 410 feet at the Tennessee River in northwestern Colbert County to 980 feet in southeastern Colbert County at the broadcast facility's tower of WQPR-FM/WFIQ-TV.

National protected area
 Natchez Trace Parkway (part)

River
Tennessee River

Major creeks
 Bear Creek
 Cane Creek
 Mulberry Creek
 Spring Creek
 Town Creek

Waterfalls
 Cane Creek Canyon Waterfall
 Rainbow Branch Waterfall
 Wilson Dam Waterfall

Notable springs
 Big Spring at Tuscumbia
 Buzzard Roost Spring at Margerum
 Chalybeate Spring at Littleville
 Milk Springs at Colbert Heights
 Shegog Spring at Ford City

Notable mountains
 Bald Knob
 Coburn Mountain
 Colbert Mountain
 Hawk Pride Mountain
 LaGrange Mountain
 Mountain Mills Ridge
 Sand Mountain
 Underwood Mountain
 Wagnon Mountain
 Wheeler Mountain

Adjacent counties
Lauderdale County, Alabama - north
Lawrence County, Alabama - southeast
Franklin County, Alabama - south
Tishomingo County, Mississippi - west

Transportation

Major highways
 U.S. Highway 43
 U.S. Highway 72
 State Route 13
 State Route 17
 State Route 20
 State Route 133
 State Route 157
 State Route 184
 State Route 247
Natchez Trace Parkway

Rail
Norfolk Southern Railway  - freight lines going South, East, and West.

Airports
 Big River Airpark
 Northwest Alabama Regional Airport

Demographics

2000
As of the census of 2000, there were 54,984 people, 22,461 households, and 16,037 families residing in the county.  The population density was 92 people per square mile (36/km2).  There were 24,980 housing units at an average density of 42 per square mile (16/km2).  The racial makeup of the county was 78.52% White or European American (non-Hispanic), 16.62% Black or African American, 0.37% Native American, 0.24% Asian, 0.02% Pacific Islander, 0.34% from other races, and 0.89% from two or more races.  1.12% of the population were Hispanic or Latino of any race.

2010
According to the 2010 United States Census Bureau:

80.4% White (non-Hispanic)
14.0% Black
0.4% Native American
0.7% Asian
0.0% Native Hawaiian or Pacific Islander
0.91% Two or more races
2.0% Hispanic or Latino (of any race)

There were 22,461 households, out of which 30.50% had children under the age of 18 living with them, 56.00% were married couples living together, 12.10% had a female householder with no husband present, and 28.60% were non-families. 26.10% of all households were made up of individuals, and 11.50% had someone living alone who was 65 years of age or older.  The average household size was 2.42 and the average family size was 2.92.

In the county, the population was spread out, with 23.80% under the age of 18, 8.10% from 18 to 24, 27.80% from 25 to 44, 24.90% from 45 to 64, and 15.40% who were 65 years of age or older.  The median age was 39 years. For every 100 females, there were 91.80 males.  For every 100 females age 18 and over, there were 88.10 males.

The median income for a household in the county was $31,954, and the median income for a family was $39,294. Males had a median income of $32,112 versus $20,107 for females. The per capita income for the county was $17,533.  About 11.10% of families and 14.00% of the population were below the poverty line, including 18.40% of those under age 18 and 11.90% of those age 65 or over.

2020

As of the 2020 United States census, there were 57,227 people, 21,880 households, and 14,797 families residing in the county.

Government
Colbert County is governed by a County Commission that is composed of six members, elected from single-member districts, numbered one through six, by the qualified voters residing within each district.  The term of office is 4 years. The six districts are apportioned as provided by law.  Each Commissioner resides in the same district he or she represents at the time of qualifying for office and during his or her tenure.  The Chair of the Commission rotates among the six members of the Commission with each Commissioner serving as Chair for one-sixth of his or her four-year term of office.  Regularly-scheduled meetings of the Colbert County Commission are held in the evenings of the 1st and 3rd Tuesday of each month.

Communities

Cities
Muscle Shoals
Sheffield
Tuscumbia (county seat)

Towns
Cherokee
Leighton
Littleville

Unincorporated communities
Allsboro
Barton
Buzzard Roost
Ford City
Hatton
Listerhill
Maud
Mountain Mills
Nitrate City
Pride
Spring Valley
Village Number 1

Education

Colleges
 Northwest Shoals Community College

Public School Systems

Colbert County School System
 Cherokee Elementary School
 Cherokee High School
 Colbert County High School
 Colbert Heights Elementary School
 Colbert Heights High School
 Hatton Elementary School
 Leighton Elementary School
 New Bethel Elementary School

Muscle Shoals City School System
 Muscle Shoals High School
 Muscle Shoals Middle School
 Muscle Shoals Career Academy
 Highland Park Elementary School
 Howell Graves Preschool
 McBride Elementary School
 Webster Elementary School

Sheffield City School System
 Sheffield High School
 Sheffield Junior High School
 L.E. Wilson Elementary School
 W.A. Threadgill Primary School

Tuscumbia City School System
 Deshler High School
 Deshler Middle School
 Deshler Career Technical Center
 G.W. Trenholm Primary School
 R.E. Thompson Intermediate School

Parks and Recreation
 Alabama Wildlife Refuge Area at Pleasant Site
 Avalon Park, Tuscumbia
 Buzzard Roost Park, Margerum
 Colbert County Park, Pride and Margerum
 Highland Park, Tuscumbia
 John W. Gattman Park, Muscle Shoals
 Colbert Ferry Park, Cherokee
 North Alabama State Fair Park, Tuscumbia
 Park West, Tuscumbia
 Rivermont Park on the Tennessee River, Tuscumbia
 Rosetrail Park, Margerum
 Spring Park, Tuscumbia
 Tenth Avenue Park, Sheffield
 Thomas State Wildlife Refuge, Barton
 York Terrace Park, Sheffield

Historical Sites and Attractions
 Alabama Music Hall of Fame, Tuscumbia
 Barton Hall, Cherokee - National Historic Landmarks
 Belle Mont Mansion/Plantation
 Cane Creek Canyon and Natural Preserve
 Colbert County Courthouse Square Historic District, Tuscumbia
 Coon Dog Memorial Graveyard of Key-Underwood, Cherokee
 F.A.M.E. Recording Studios, Muscle Shoals
 Ivy Green - Birthplace of Helen Keller, Tuscumbia
 LaGrange College Site and Monument, Leighton
 Natchez Trace Parkway
 Nitrate Village Number 1 Historic District, Sheffield 
 Old Railroad Bridge of 1839 on the Tennessee River
 Rosenwald School site, Cherokee
 Tennessee Valley Art Museum, Tuscumbia
 Tuscumbia Railroad Depot Museum
 TVA Walking Trails and Recreation Area
 Wilson Lock and Dam, Muscle Shoals
See also:
National Register of Historic Places listings in Colbert County, Alabama
Properties on the Alabama Register of Landmarks and Heritage in Colbert County, Alabama

Annual Events
  Belle Mont Celtic Fest - May
  Muscle Shoals Area Street Rods Car Show Festival - May
  Recall LaGrange Commemorations - May
  North Alabama African Heritage Festival - June
  Leighton Juneteenth Celebration - June
  Helen Keller Festival - June
  W.C. Handy Music Festival - July
  Coon Dog Labor Day Celebration - September
  “Oka Kapassa” – Return to Cold Water American Indian Festival - September
  Annual Christmas Parades of Muscle Shoals, Tuscumbia, Sheffield - December

In popular culture
Colbert County was featured in a three-part comedy feature on Comedy Central's The Colbert Report from November 28–30, 2006.
Colbert County is the setting for the Drive-by Truckers  song,  "Putting People on the Moon"

Notable People
 Arthur Alexander
 Jason Allen - American football
 Beverly Barton
 Lefty Bates
 Deion Belue
 Boyd Bennett
 Robert Byrne - songwriter
 Marcel Black
 Archibald Hill Carmichael
 Pete Carr
 Amanda Chase
 George Colbert
 Levi Colbert
 Mike Cooley (musician)
 Dominique Croom
 Ben Cunningham (activist)
 Rece Davis
 Bobby E. Denton
 James Deshler
 Leon Douglas
 Cecil Dowdy
 Alecia Elliott
 Henry S. Foote
 Douglas A. Foster
 Al Gamble
 Wayne Greenhaw
 Wendell Wilkie Gunn
 Rick Hall
 Howell Heflin
 Kelvin Holly
 Dennis Homan
 David Hood
 Patterson Hood
 Jimmy Hughes
 Richard H. Jackson
 Rick James (baseball)
 Jimmy Johnson (session guitarist)
 Helen Keller
 John W. Keys
 Adam Lazzara
 Maud McKnight Lindsay
 Robert B. Lindsay
 Frank Manush
 Heinie Manush
 Kenny Mims
 Guy Morton
 Alfred Huger Moses
 Stan Munsey
 Ozzie Newsome
 Gary Nichols
 Jimmie Orr
 Margaret Pellegrini
 Anthony Piccione
 Will Reynolds
 Willie Ruff
 Wimp Sanderson
 William Henry Sawtelle
 Mark Sears
 Herschel Sizemore
 Joseph Humphrey Sloss
 William H. Steele (judge)
 Phillip Swann
 Percy Sledge
 Leigh Tiffin
 Chris Tompkins
 Fred Thompson
 Ken Tribble
 Wilson D. Watson
 Ed West
 John Paul White
 William Willis (artiest)

References

External links
Colbert County official website
Colbert County Tourism
City of Tuscumbia official website

 
Alabama counties
Florence–Muscle Shoals metropolitan area
1867 establishments in Alabama
Counties of Appalachia
Populated places established in 1867